Sebastine Ikahihifo (born 27 January 1991) is a New Zealand professional rugby league footballer who plays as a  and  for the Huddersfield Giants in the Betfred Super League.

He previously played for the New Zealand Warriors in the NRL.

Background
Ikahihifo was born in Auckland, New Zealand, and is of Tongan descent.

He played his junior rugby league for the Mangere East Hawks.

Playing career

Early career

He signed for the New Zealand Warriors in 2010 and played 36 games in the Toyota Cup, being part of the 2010 and 2011 grand final victories. In 2012, Ikahihifo played for the Auckland Vulcans in the NSW Cup.

2012
In Round 21 of the 2012 NRL season, Ikahihifo made his first grade début for the New Zealand Warriors against the Manly-Warringah Sea Eagles playing off the interchange bench in the Warriors' 24-22 loss at NIB Stadium in Perth. Ikahihifo played in 4 matches for the Warriors in the 2012 NRL season.

2013

Ikahihifo finished the 2013 NRL season with him playing in 8 matches for the Warriors.

2014
In February 2014, Ikahihifo was selected in the Warriors' inaugural 2014 Auckland Nines squad. In June 2014, Ikahihifo had his contract extended to the end of the 2015 season. Ikahihifo finished off the Warriors' 2014 NRL season with him playing in 18 matches.

2015
On 16 January, Ikahihifo was named in the Warriors' 2015 NRL Auckland Nines wider training squad but did not make the final squad. In Round 5 against the Melbourne Storm, he scored his first NRL career try in the Warriors' 30-14 loss at AAMI Park. He finished off the season having played in 9 matches and scoring a try. On 23 September, he signed a 2-year contract with the St. George Illawarra Dragons starting in 2016.

2016
On 29 January, Ikahihifo was named in the Dragons 2016 Auckland Nines squad. He was released from his Dragons contract without making an appearance for the club in order to join the Huddersfield Giants in the Super League as a mid-season transfer.

2017
In 2017, Ikahihifo was named in the Super League Dream Team.

2018
He made a total of 20 appearances for Huddersfield in all competitions as the club missed the finals series finishing 5th.

2019
He made a total of 18 appearances in the 2019 season as Huddersfield finished a disappointing 10th.

2020
He joined Salford on loan in the 2020 season.  He later played for Salford in their 2020 Challenge Cup Final defeat against Leeds.

2021
On 13 Nov 2020 the club website reported that they would extend the loan period to cover the 2021 season.

References

External links
Huddersfield Giants profile
St. George Illawarra Dragons profile
SL profile

1991 births
Living people
New Zealand rugby league players
New Zealand sportspeople of Tongan descent
New Zealand expatriate sportspeople in England
New Zealand Warriors players
Auckland rugby league team players
Mangere East Hawks players
Junior Kiwis players
Rugby league second-rows
Rugby league locks
Rugby league players from Auckland
Huddersfield Giants players